The Division of Werriwa is an Australian electoral division in the state of New South Wales. The name Werriwa derives from a local Aboriginal name for Lake George, which was located in the division when it was established in 1900. The division was one of the original 65 divisions first contested at the first federal election.

Werriwa now covers an area in south-west Sydney, including the suburbs of Ashcroft, Austral, Bonnyrigg Heights, Busby, Carnes Hill, Cartwright, Casula, Cecil Hills, Edmondson Park, Glenfield, Green Valley, Heckenberg, Hinchinbrook, Horningsea Park, Hoxton Park, Long Point, Lurnea, Macquarie Fields, Macquarie Links, Middleton Grange, Miller, Minto, Prestons, Sadleir, and West Hoxton; as well as parts of Badgerys Creek, Bonnyrigg, Bringelly, Cecil Park, Denham Court, Ingleburn, Kemps Creek, Leppington, Mount Pritchard, and Rossmore.

The current Member for Werriwa, since the 2016 federal election, is Anne Stanley, a member of the Australian Labor Party.

Geography
Since 1984, federal electoral division boundaries in Australia have been determined at redistributions by a redistribution committee appointed by the Australian Electoral Commission. Redistributions occur for the boundaries of divisions in a particular state, and they occur every seven years, or sooner if a state's representation entitlement changes or when divisions of a state are malapportioned.

History

Originally, Werriwa was a large and mostly rural electorate that stretched from south-west Sydney to the northern part of what is now the ACT, and included the Southern Highlands, Goulburn, and part of the South West Slopes. In succeeding years, with demographic change and electoral redistributions, Werriwa began to shrink and, from 1913 onwards, no longer included Lake George. It underwent several other major changes to its borders over the years. However, it has retained the name of Werriwa, primarily as it is an original Federation electorate—the Australian Electoral Commission's guidelines on electoral redistributions require it to preserve the names of original Federation electorates where possible.

It is a very safe seat for Labor, which has held it continuously since 1934 and for all but nine years since 1906.

Werriwa is best remembered for being the electorate of former Prime Minister Gough Whitlam, who held it from 1952 to 1978.  It was represented from 1994 to 2005 by one of Whitlam's former aides, Mark Latham, the leader of the ALP and Leader of the Opposition from 2003 to 2005. In more recent times, a by-election in March 2005 resulted in Labor's Chris Hayes elected with over 55% of the vote, in a 16-candidate race which saw no other candidate poll above 8%.

Demographics 
Werriwa is a heavily working-class electorate and is considered part of Labor's "Red Wall".

Werriwa is home to relatively large immigrant communities. According to the 2016 census, 64.8% of electors had both parents born outside of Australia. 40.0% of people only speak English at home. Other languages spoken at home include Arabic 10.1%, Vietnamese 6.3%, Hindi 4.3%, Spanish 2.8% and Italian 2.2%.

Members

Election results

References

External links
 Division of Werriwa – Australian Electoral Commission

Electoral divisions of Australia
Constituencies established in 1901
1901 establishments in Australia
Gough Whitlam